This article is about education in Seychelles and its evolution from private mission schools to compulsory public education in the modern system. Seychelles has the highest literacy rate of any country in sub-Saharan Africa. According to The World Factbook - Central Intelligence Agency as of 2018, 95.9% of the population age 15 and over can read and write in Seychelles were respectively literate.

History
Until the mid-19th century, little formal education was available in Seychelles. Both the Roman Catholic and Anglican churches opened mission schools in 1851. The missions continued to operate the secondary schools — Seychelles College run by the Brothers of Christian Instruction and Regina Mundi Convent run by the Sisters of St. Joseph of Cluny — even after the government became responsible for education in 1944, though primary schools were established throughout the islands with mainly untrained teachers. After a teacher training college opened in 1959 'to cater for in-service teachers of promise without previous training, and to train new entrants to teaching' (quote from article by S. Quinlan: "The Teacher Training College" in Seychelles Government Bulletin, July 27, 1961) a two-year training course was offered for secondary teachers or a one-year course for in-service primary teachers, resulting in a supply of locally trained teachers becoming available. Since 1981 a system of free education has been in effect requiring attendance by all children in grades one to nine, beginning at age five. Formerly, school-age children were required to participate in the National Youth Service (NYS).

The literacy rate for school-aged children had risen to more than 90 percent by the late 1980s. Many older Seychellois had not been taught to read or write in their childhood, but adult education classes helped raise adult literacy from 60 percent to a claimed 85 percent in 1991.

Current status

Education is compulsory up to the age of 16, and free through secondary school until age 18. Students must pay for uniforms, but not for books or tuition. In 2002, the gross primary enrollment rate was 114 percent and the net primary enrollment rate was 100 percent. Gross and net enrollment ratios are based on the number of students formally registered in primary school and therefore do not necessarily reflect actual school attendance. Primary school attendance statistics are not available for Seychelles. As of 2002, 99 percent of children who started primary school were likely to reach grade 5.

Children are first taught to read and write in Creole. Beginning in grade three, English is used as a teaching language in certain subjects. French is introduced in grade six.

Private education has been an option in Seychelles since the late 1960s, however it was only in 1994 that Seychellois students were allowed to attend non-state schools. There are three private schools on Mahe; The International School Seychelles, L'Ecole Francaise and The Independent School. There is also a Montessori school. The International School and the Independent School offer A level courses (post-16). There is one private school on Praslin, the Vijay International School Praslin, which currently educates children up to A Level standard. Altogether some 2000 students are educated in the private sector.

Students can attend Seychelles Polytechnic (1,600 students in 1991) for pre-university studies or other training. In 1993, responding to popular pressure, the government eliminated the requirement of NYS participation in order to enter the Polytechnic. However, it strongly encouraged students to complete NYS before beginning to work at age eighteen. The largest number of students were in teacher training (302), business studies (255), humanities and science (226), and hotels and tourism (132).

On September 17, 2009, the University of Seychelles was established.  There are currently 175 students based on two campuses.  The main campus is situated at Anse Royale and the second campus for the School of Education is located at Mont Fleuri.

References

External links
 Seychelles Ministry of Education
 Education Statistics and Quality of Education in Seychelles, Southern and Eastern Africa Consortium for Monitoring Educational Quality (SACMEQ)